Argyrophis diardii, known commonly as Diard's blind snake, the Indochinese blind snake, the large blind snake, or the large worm snake, is a species of harmless snake in the family Typhlopidae. The species is endemic to South Asia and Southeast Asia. There are two recognized subspecies.

Geographic range
A. diardii is distributed in India (Jalpaiguri-West Bengal, as far west as Dun Valley in Assam), Bangladesh, Myanmar, Thailand, Laos, Cambodia, Vietnam, the Malay Peninsula, Nias Island, Sumatra, Web Island (off northwest Sumatra), Bangka, and Borneo.

Etymology
Both the specific name, diardii, and the common name, "Diard's blindsnake", are in honor of French naturalist Pierre-Médard Diard.

Taxonomy
A. diardii was first described by Hermann Schlegel in 1839, as Typhlops Diardii. The type locality of Schlegel's specimen was "Cochinchina [southern Vietnam]". Saint Girons (1972: 32) described it as "Cochinchina sans certitude [southern Vietnam without certainty]", and Hahn (1980: 56) as "East Indies".

Habitat
The preferred natural habitats of A. diardii are forest, shrubland, and grassland, but it has also been found in agricultural areas.

Description
A. diardii is heavy-bodied for a blindsnake. It has 22–25 scale rows around the body at midbody. The belly is distinctly flat.

Subspecies
Two subspecies of Typhlops diardii are recognized as being valid, including the nominotypical subspecies: 
Argyrophis diardii diardii 
Argyrophis diardii platyventris

References

Further reading

Boulenger GA (1893). Catalogue of the Snakes in the British Museum (Natural History). Volume I., Containing the Families Typhlopidæ ... London: Trustees of the British Museum (Natural History. (Taylor and Francis, printers). xiii + 448 pp. + Plates I-XXVIII. (Typhlops diardi, pp. 22–23; T. muelleri, p. 25; T. nigroalbus, p. 24; T. schneideri, p. 27).
Wallach V (2000). "Critical review of some recent descriptions of Pakistani Typhlops by M.S. Khan, 1999 (Serpentes: Typhlopidae)". Hamadryad 25 (2): 129-143.

diardii
Taxa named by Hermann Schlegel
Reptiles described in 1839